The 2013 Renault UK Clio Cup is a multi-event, one make motor racing championship held across England. The championship features a mix of professional motor racing teams and privately funded drivers, competing in a Clio Renault Sport 200 that conform to the technical regulations for the championship. 2013 will be the final season for the current car. It forms part of the extensive program of support categories built up around the BTCC centrepiece.

This season will be the 18th Renault Clio Cup United Kingdom season. The season will commence on 31 March at Brands Hatch – on the circuit's Indy configuration – and will conclude on 13 October at the same venue, utilising the Grand Prix circuit, after sixteen races to be held at eight meetings, all in support of the 2013 British Touring Car Championship.

Championship changes
After a single year with the SRO as series promoter in 2012, the championship is returning to the hands of the British Automobile Racing Club with Simon North making a return to the role of Championship Manager. A post he held between 1992 and 2011. Further changes include a switch to Dunlop Tyres for the 2013 season, after several years using Michelin rubber.

Teams and drivers

Race calendar and results
The championship calendar was announced by the series organisers on 7 December 2012.

Championship standings

Drivers' Championship

(*) Drivers drop lowest race result (excluding DSQ)

References

Renault Clio Cup
Renault Clio Cup UK seasons